Bruno Albuquerque (born 10 January 1989) is a Portuguese middle- and long-distance runner. He represented his country at the 2010 World Indoor Championships without advancing from the first round.

International competitions

Personal bests
Outdoor
800 metres – 1:52.95 (Leiria 2009)
1500 metres – 3:43.89 (Huelva 2009)
3000 metres – 8:08.91 (Langenthal 2013)
5000 metres – 13:47.02 (Heusden-Zolder 2014)
10,000 metres – 29:06.13 (Huelva 2017)
10 kilometres – 29:36 (Porto 2011)
Half marathon – 1:08:48 (Porto 2012)
Indoor
800 metres – 1:53.01 (Pombal 2009)
1500 metres – 3:41.38 (Birmingham 2010)
3000 metres – 8:08.37 (Espinho 2012)

References

1989 births
Living people
People from Mangualde
Portuguese male middle-distance runners
Portuguese male long-distance runners
S.L. Benfica athletes
Sportspeople from Viseu District